Uman is a municipality of Chuuk, in the Federated States of Micronesia. It includes Uman Island and uninhabited Kuop Atoll.

References
 Statoids.com, retrieved December 8, 2010
http://islands.unep.ch/CLV.htm

Municipalities of Chuuk State